Deh Damcheh (also Romanized as Deh Dāmcheh and Dehdāmcheh; also known as Dāmcheh and Deh Dombeh) is a village in Kamfiruz-e Shomali Rural District, Kamfiruz District, Marvdasht County, Fars Province, Iran. At the 2006 census, its population was 177, in 40 families.

References 

Populated places in Marvdasht County